Haggart Lake is a lake in the municipalities of Georgian Bay and Muskoka Lakes, District Municipality of Muskoka in Central Ontario, Canada. It is in the Great Lakes Basin and is the source of Haggart Creek.

The east end of the lake is in the municipality of Muskoka Lakes, and the rest of the lake is in the municipality of Georgian Bay. There are three unnamed inflows at the west, northwest and north. The primary outflow is Haggart Creek, leaving at the east. Haggart Creek flows via the Moon River to Georgian Bay on Lake Huron.

The Canadian Pacific Railway main line runs along the eastern shore of the lake.

See also
List of lakes in Ontario

References

Lakes of the District Municipality of Muskoka